Kamakshi Jayaraman is the first woman mayor of the city corporation of Chennai, Tamil Nadu.

Mayor of Chennai

Kamakshi Jayaraman belongs to the party of Dravida Munnetra Kazhagam. She was elected as the first woman mayor of Chennai Corporation in history in the year of 1971.

References

Living people
Mayors of Chennai
Year of birth missing (living people)
Dravida Munnetra Kazhagam politicians